Ana Lucia de León (born 24 June 1991) is a Guatemalan badminton player.

Achievements

BWF International Challenge/Series 
Women's singles

Women's doubles

Mixed doubles

  BWF International Challenge tournament
  BWF International Series tournament
  BWF Future Series tournament

References

External links 
 

1991 births
Living people
Guatemalan female badminton players
Badminton players at the 2011 Pan American Games
Central American and Caribbean Games gold medalists for Guatemala
Competitors at the 2014 Central American and Caribbean Games
Central American and Caribbean Games medalists in badminton
Pan American Games competitors for Guatemala